Cojasca is a commune in Dâmbovița County, Muntenia, Romania. It is composed of three villages: Cojasca, Fântânele and Iazu. At the 2011 census, 77.8% of inhabitants were Roma and 22.2% Romanians.

References

Communes in Dâmbovița County
Localities in Muntenia